Edmond Robert Wodehouse  (3 June 1835 – 14 December 1914) was  an English Liberal and Liberal Unionist politician who sat in the House of Commons from 1885 to 1906.

Biography
Wodehouse was the only child of Sir Philip Edmond Wodehouse, Governor of Bombay, and Katherine Mary Templer daughter of Francis J Templer. He was educated at Eton College and at Balliol College, Oxford being awarded B.A. and M.A. 1865. He was called to the bar at Lincoln's Inn in 1861. He was private secretary to his cousin, John Wodehouse, 1st Earl of Kimberley, when he was Viceroy of Ireland from 1864 to 1866, Lord Privy Seal from 1868 to 1870 and Secretary of State for Colonies from 1870 to 1874.

Wodehouse married in 1876 Adele Sophia Harriett Bagot, daughter of Reverend Charles Walter Bagot  Chancellor of Bath and Wells and Rector of Castle Rising, Norfolk.

At the 1880 general election Wodehouse was elected as a Member of Parliament (MP) for Bath. He held the seat until 1906. In 1898 he was admitted to the Privy Council.

Wodehouse died in December 1914, aged 79.

References

External links 
 

1835 births
1914 deaths
People educated at Eton College
Members of the Privy Council of the United Kingdom
Liberal Party (UK) MPs for English constituencies
UK MPs 1880–1885
UK MPs 1885–1886
UK MPs 1886–1892
UK MPs 1892–1895
UK MPs 1895–1900
UK MPs 1900–1906
Edmond Wodehouse
Liberal Unionist Party MPs for English constituencies